Jiří Ignác Línek (21 January 1725 – 30 December 1791) was a Czech late-Baroque composer and pedagogue, said to have composed over 300 works in his lifetime. He is especially noted for his Christmas pastorals and for his initiation of a literary brotherhood within Bohemia.

Life 
He was born at Bakov nad Jizerou, Bohemia. In the period official register, his name was entered as Linka, but he always signed himself Linek. He studied at the Piarist gymnasium in Kosmonosy; later, he studied composition with Josef Seger. From 1747 to his death, he was a teacher, choirmaster and member of the literary fraternity in Bakov nad Jizerou. He died of tuberculosis; his gravesite is unknown.

Style 
Most of Linek's music was composed for the church. His favorite instrument was the harpsichord. Many of his religious works were composed on Czech texts. He composed at least thirty pastorals, Easter sepolcros, as well as devotional pieces dedicated to St. John Nepomucene.

References

External links
Short Biography 
Works

1725 births
1791 deaths
Czech Baroque composers
Czech male classical composers
People from Bakov nad Jizerou
18th-century classical composers
18th-century male musicians